NextRadioTV is a French company consisting of BFM TV and RMC. NextRadioTV is on the CAC Small.

History
In 2000, the NextRadioTV company was founded by Alain Weill, who also serves as Chairman of the Board and chief executive officer.

Operations

Radio stations
 BFM Business
 RMC

TV stations
 BFM TV – national news channel.
 BFM Business – business news channel.
 RMC Story – generalist channel.
 RMC Découverte – documentary channel.
 BFM Régions – regional news network.
BFM DICI Alpes du Sud
BFM DICI Haute-Provence
BFM Grand Lille
BFM Grand Littoral
BFM Paris Ile-de-France
BFM Lyon
BFM Marseille Provence
BFM Nice Côte d'Azur
BFM Rouen
BFM Strasbourg
BFM Toulon Var
 RMC Sport – sports channels.

Groupe 01
NextRadioTV also owns the media group Groupe 01 (formerly Groupe Tests), which specializes in the field of printed magazines and on the Web:

Websites
 01Net
 01Men

Magazines
 Micro Hebdo
 L'Ordinateur Individuel
 01 Informatique

References

Companies established in 2000
Mass media companies of France
Television networks in France